Thicket Priory is a religious house in the civil parish of Thorganby, North Yorkshire, England, located about   south-east of York. It lies in the Roman Catholic Diocese of Middlesbrough.

Description
A Benedictine priory for nuns stood on the site of Thicket Priory from the 1180s and was dissolved in 1539, its building being demolished in 1850. There is also evidence of a devotion to ‘Our Lady of Thicket’ dating from this time.

New monastic buildings were erected in the grounds of the former establishment, and these re-founded as a Carmelite monastery in 2009.

The building that was used by the community until 2009 was erected as a country house between 1844 and 1847, and was sold by Lt Col Sir John Dunnington-Jefferson in 1955 to the Carmelite Sisters of Exmouth. This group of buildings holds three Grade II listed buildings: the former house itself, its lodge, and coach house with stables and brewery,

The building was up for sale in April 2013, with an asking price of £3,000,000. As of January 2014, the estate had been reduced to £2,500,000. It was converted to a large private house about this time; the nuns  moved into a new purpose built convent in 2009.

Interior and grounds

See also
 More House, York.

References

External links
 
 
Thicket Priory from Carmelites
"Thorganby", Genuki.org.uk. Retrieved 18 November 2011
Image of Priory Overlooking Lake

Carmelite monasteries in England
Cistercian nunneries in England
Monasteries in North Yorkshire
Christian monasteries established in the 12th century
Edward Blore buildings
1180s establishments in England
1539 disestablishments in England
1955 establishments in England
Discalced Carmelite Order in the United Kingdom